Truffaut is a French surname that may refer to
 François Truffaut (1932–1984), French film director, screenwriter, producer, actor and critic
 François Truffaut Award
 Bibliothèque du cinéma François-Truffaut, a film library in Paris
 François Truffaut: Stolen Portraits, a 1993 French documentary film
 Hitchcock/Truffaut, a 1966 book by François Truffaut about Alfred Hitchcock
 Hitchcock/Truffaut (film), a 2015 French-American documentary film
 , a street in the 12th arrondissement of Paris
  (born 1953), French footballer
  (born 1961), French actress and photographer; daughter of François Truffaut and Madeleine Morgenstern
  (1926–2014), Belgian politician
 , ((1872–1948) French gardener, founder of Jardineries Truffaut
  (1901–1942), Belgian politician
 Joanna Truffaut, French Digital transformation advisor and entrepreneur
  (1894–1974), French politician
 , a street in the 17th arrondissement of Paris

French-language surnames